The 1951 Bradley Braves football team was an American football team that represented Bradley University as a member of the Missouri Valley Conference (MVC) during the 1951 college football season. Led by first-year head coach  Bus Mertes, the Braves compiled an overall record of 4–5 with a mark of 0–3 in conference play, placing last out of seven teams in the MVC.

Following the season, Bradley withdrew from Missouri Valley Conference in solidarity with Drake University, who left the conference in protest over the Johnny Bright incident, in which Johnny Bright, star halfback for the Drake Bulldogs, was assaulted by an Oklahoma A&M player during a game in October of that year. Bradley officials explained that the school's difficulty in scheduling games with conference members and the MVC's voiding of Bradley's championships in basketball and baseball following a point-fixing scandal also contributed to the decision to withdraw.

Schedule

References

Bradley
Bradley Braves football seasons
Bradley Bravess football